The 1975–76 Syracuse Orangemen men's basketball team represented Syracuse University in NCAA Division I men's competition in the 1975–76 academic year.

Schedule

References 

Syracuse
Syracuse Orange men's basketball seasons
Syracuse
Syracuse Orange
Syracuse Orange